Edward "Eddie" Theobald (28 September 1940 – 26 March 2010) was a Maltese footballer who played as a midfielder and made 18 appearances for the Malta national team.

Career
Theobald made his debut for Malta on 18 June 1961 in a friendly match against Italy C, which finished as a 0–3 loss. He went on to make 18 appearances, scoring 2 goals, before making his last appearance on 30 April 1972 in a 1974 FIFA World Cup qualification match against Austria, which finished as a 0–4 loss.

Career statistics

International

International goals

References

External links
 
 
 

1940 births
2010 deaths
Maltese footballers
Maltese football managers
Malta international footballers
Association football midfielders
Hibernians F.C. players
Maltese Premier League players
Hibernians F.C. managers
Maltese Premier League managers